
Year 804 (DCCCIV) was a leap year starting on Monday (link will display the full calendar) of the Julian calendar.

Events 
 By place 

 Abbasid Caliphate 
 Battle of Krasos: Emperor Nikephoros I refuses to pay the tribute imposed by Caliph Harun al-Rashid of the Abbasid Caliphate. A Muslim-Arab expeditionary force invades Asia Minor. During a surprise attack, Nikephoros suffers a major defeat against the Saracens at Krasos in Phrygia. According to Arabian sources, the Byzantines lose 40,700 men and 4,000 pack animals, while Nikephoros himself is almost killed, but saved by the bravery of his officers.
 Abbasid caliph Harun al-Rashid marries Abbasa, the daughter of Abbasid prince and official Sulayman.

 Europe 
 Summer – Emperor Charlemagne finishes the conquest of Saxony. The Carolingian administration in the north is restored and the diocese of Bremen is re-established. Venice, torn by infighting, switches allegiance from Constantinople to King Pepin of Italy, son of Charlemagne. 
 Obelerio degli Antenori becomes the ninth doge of Venice, after his predecessor Giovanni Galbaio flees to Mantua, where he is killed. 
 The Gymnasium Carolinum in Osnabrück is founded by Charlemagne (the oldest school in Germany).

 Asia 
 Kūkai, Japanese Buddhist monk, travels in a government-sponsored expedition to China, in order to learn more about the Mahavairocana Sutra. He brings back texts of Shingon (Esoteric Buddhism).
 Priest Saichō, patriarch of Tendai Buddhism, visits China and reportedly brings back tea seeds (or 805).
 The Inscription of Sukabumi from Eastern Java marks the beginning of the Javanese language.

 By topic 

 Religion 
 Ludger, Frisian missionary, becomes the first bishop of Münster, and builds a monastery there.

Births 
 Bayazid Bastami, Persian Sufi (d. 874)
 Fujiwara no Yoshifusa, Japanese regent (d. 872)

Deaths 
 May 19 – Alcuin, bishop and advisor to Charlemagne
 October 1 – Richbod, archbishop of Trier
 Saint Abundantia, Christian saint
 Giovanni Galbaio, doge of Venice (approximate date)
 Ibrahim al-Mawsili, musician and singer (b. 742)
 Lu Yu, Chinese author of The Classic of Tea (b. 733)
 Ragnar Lothbrok Legendary Norse Viking hero and Scandinavian King.

References

Sources